Highway 8, known as the Nicola Highway, is an alternate route to Highway 97C between Highway 1 and the Coquihalla Highway (Highway 5) in the Thompson-Nicola Regional District.  Highway 8 was first numbered in 1953, and very little about the highway  changed between that year and 2021, when large segments of the highway were washed out by floods.

History
Highway 8 is part of the first automobile route built to connect the Lower Mainland to the Alberta border. Named the Southern Trans-Provincial Highway, it ran from Vancouver to Crowsnest Pass and was later designated as Route A; the route followed Kingsway and Yale Road from Vancouver to Hope, then turned north to Spences Bridge. The route then turned southeast and passed through Merritt and Princeton along present-day Highway 8 and Highway 5A before travelling east along present-day Crowsnest Highway (Highway 3) towards Osoyoos, the Kootenays, and the Alberta border. In 1941, British Columbia transitioned from lettered to numbered highways, with the Lower Mainland section of Route A becoming Highway 1 and the remainder becoming Highway 3. After the end of World War II, the provincial government began to upgrade its highway system and constructed new sections of its highways.

When the Okanagan Connector was constructed between Merritt and Kelowna in the late 1980s, initial proposals had it designated as Highway 8; however, communities on the route preferred it designated as an auxiliary route of Highway 97 and was designated as Highway 97C.

During the major floods in November 2021, large segments of the highway were washed out by the Nicola River. Further washouts occurred during repairs in mid-2022. On September 23, 2022, it was announced that highway had been reconnected for the first time since the washouts, enabling locals to use the highway. The highway subsequently reopened to the general public on November 9, nearly a year after the washouts.

Major intersections
For west to east. The entire route is in the Thompson-Nicola Regional District.

References

External links

 Official Numbered Routes in British Columbia
 Road trip through British Columbia

008